The Colgate Maroon-News is the student newspaper of Colgate University in Hamilton, New York. It is the oldest college weekly in America, having been founded in 1868 as Madisonesis.

History
The newspaper traces its origins back to 1846, when Hamilton Student was founded by student and abolitionist George Gavin Ritchie as "a semi-monthly mirror of Religion, Literature, Science and Art." The newspaper was shut down and Ritchie expelled by the college, then called Madison University, after he published an editorial criticizing New York residents for opposing African-American male suffrage, though he continued to publish the Hamilton Student as "The Hamilton Student and Christian Reformer."

For over two decades, there was no official student newspaper for the university. In 1868, Colgate restarted the campus newspaper under the name Madisonensis, and the modern staff considers this as its official foundation. The newspaper's name was officially changed to the Colgate Maroon in 1916. An independent paper, the Colgate News, emerged in 1969, as a less liberal alternative to the official student newspaper.

The newspaper takes its current name from the merger of the two campus weeklies in 1991.

Circulation
The Colgate Maroon-News has a circulation of 2,250 print copies, which are distributed around campus, the Village of Hamilton, and to subscribing alumni.

Staff
In a typical year, The Colgate Maroon-News has approximately 75 student members.

References

External links
The Colgate Maroon-News web site
Colgate University web site

Student newspapers published in New York (state)
Colgate University